"Yeah!" is a song recorded by Canadian country music artist Paul Brandt. It was released in 1998 as the third single from his second studio album, Outside the Frame. It peaked at number 5 on the RPM Country Tracks chart in June 1998.

Chart performance

Year-end charts

References

1998 singles
Paul Brandt songs
Reprise Records singles
Song recordings produced by Josh Leo
1997 songs
Songs written by Paul Brandt